Randolph Brody Altschuler (born December 8, 1970) is an American businessman and politician. He was the Republican and Conservative Party candidate for Congress in New York's 1st Congressional District in 2010 and 2012. He is the co-founder and chief executive officer (CEO) of Xometry, Inc.

Early life and education
Altschuler was born and raised in New York City by a single mother, Sheila Brody, and graduated from Hunter College High School in 1989. He attended Princeton University, working his way through school as a short order cook and campus security guard. He graduated in 1993 with a Bachelor of Arts (B.A.) in German Studies and Literature, earning High Honors. In 1994, Altschuler studied at the University of Vienna as a Fulbright Scholar. In 1998, Altschuler graduated from Harvard Business School earning a Master of Business Administration (MBA) degree with Distinction.

Business career
Altschuler worked as an investment banker at Donaldson, Lufkin & Jenrette and served as an assistant to the CEO of Deutsche Bank North America, focusing on strategic and management issues. After getting his MBA, Altschuler worked in private equity at The Blackstone Group. As an entrepreneur, Altschuler has co-founded three successful companies, including Office Tiger in 1999, CloudBlue in 2001, and Xometry in 2013, where he is CEO. Xometry became a public company on June 30, 2021, trading on Nasdaq under the ticker symbol XMTR.

Office Tiger
In 1999, Altschuler and Princeton classmate Joseph Sigelman started OfficeTiger, a business process outsourcing (BPO) company that performs back-office support services for American companies. In July 2005, Business Week magazine reported that OfficeTiger was the only successful startup in India's outsourcing industry owned and managed by U.S. entrepreneurs.

Altschuler claims that OfficeTiger is not a traditional outsourcing company, but rather one whose overseas employees "enhance the services and jobs that Americans are doing here domestically," and contends, "You want the professionals here doing different kinds of things than he or she is doing today. Office Tiger allows them to take some of the more traditional tasks and outsource that offshore."

OfficeTiger was acquired by RR Donnelley in April 2006 for $250 million, and through combination with another Donnelley acquisition, Astron BPO, by September 2006 OfficeTiger had expanded to 29 offices and 42 client locations across nine countries and employed 4,000 people in India, 4,000 in Europe, 1,000 in Sri Lanka, 750 in the United States, and 300 in the Philippines.

CloudBlue
In 2001 Altschuler co-founded an electronic waste (e-waste) recycling company CloudBlue Technologies based in Norcross Georgia, having moved there in 2011 from Alpharetta, GA. He served as the company's executive chairman and worked out of their Port Jefferson, NY offices. On September 30, 2013, ClouldBlue was acquired by Ingram Micro, a large wholesale technology distributor.

Xometry
Altschuler's most recent business venture is Xometry, Inc., an advanced manufacturing company with investors including Dell Technologies Capital and Highland Capital Partners, that he co-founded with Laurence Zuriff in 2013.

2010 U.S. Congressional campaign

On August 11, 2009, Altschuler filed to run for U.S. Congress from New York's 1st congressional district against four-term incumbent Democrat Timothy Bishop. Altschuler won the September 14, 2010, Republican primary over George Demos, a former Securities and Exchange Commission prosecutor, and Christopher Nixon Cox, a grandson of Richard Nixon, receiving 45.07% of the vote. Demos received 30.32%, while Cox received 24.61%.

In the general election, Altschuler was endorsed by former New York City Mayor Rudy Giuliani, Suffolk County Executive Steve Levy, Former Massachusetts Governor and 2008 presidential contender Mitt Romney, Former New York Governor George Pataki, House Republican Whip Eric Cantor, former House Speaker Newt Gingrich, The U.S. Chamber of Commerce, the National Federation of Independent Business, Long Island Congressman Peter T. King, The New York Post, Dan Senor, John Faso, The Conservative Party of New York State, the American Conservative Union, John LeBoutillier, and numerous other local elected officials. In the days leading up to the primary, Conservative radio host Rush Limbaugh commented on the race calling Altschuler "a guy who was a Green Party pro-choice Republican in New Jersey before they shipped him out to Suffolk County to run."

Altschuler faced incumbent Tim Bishop in the November 2, 2010 general election. On Election Day Bishop was reported to have a 3,400 vote lead but after the electronic voting machines were reread at the board of elections, Altschulter was reported with a 392-vote lead, with approximately 11,000 absentee ballots left to be counted. After most absentee ballots were tabulated, Bishop had a 263-vote lead, at which point Altschuler conceded defeat to Bishop and ended his campaign on December 8 – 36 days after the election.  It was the last Congressional race decided in the United States. Altschuler lost the election by 593 votes.
 
Altschuler invested $2.2 million of his own money in the campaign.

2012 U.S. Congressional campaign

Ending speculation that he would run for the Suffolk County Executive position to succeed Steve Levy, he announced in May 2011 that he would run for Congress again in 2012.  He faced George Demos in the primary. The National Republican Congressional Committee named Altschuler to their "Young Guns" list of the top Republican candidates in the country. Altschuler secured the nomination of the Independence Party, which had delivered Bishop 7,370 votes in 2010.

Altschuler's campaign collected well over 6,000 signatures to nominate him as the Republican, Conservative and Independence Party candidate in 2012, vastly surpassing the 938 required by law.
Altschuler's only rival for the nomination left the race in May 2012.
In the election, Altschuler was again defeated by Bishop, this time by around 11,000 votes.

Young Guns
Altschuler was awarded membership in the exclusive GOP "Young Guns", a select group of young candidates chosen by Majority Leader Eric Cantor and Majority Whip Kevin McCarthy.

Personal life
Randy Altschuler is married to Cheryl Sladkin, a professional ballet dancer turned pediatrician. She was a classmate from Princeton, where they met. Cheryl was born in Thailand. They have two sons, Noah and Matthew, and a daughter Sasha.  The family lives in Potomac, Maryland.

References

External links
CloudBlue official business site
Randy Altschuler for Congress official campaign site
 
Campaign contributions at OpenSecrets.org
 OfficeTiger profile at eBusinessForum, March 22, 2006

1970 births
Businesspeople from New York City
Candidates in the 2010 United States elections
21st-century American politicians
Candidates in the 2012 United States elections
Harvard Business School alumni
Hunter College High School alumni
Jewish American people in New York (state) politics
Living people
New York (state) Republicans
Princeton University alumni
People from St. James, New York
American expatriates in Austria
20th-century American businesspeople
21st-century American businesspeople
21st-century American Jews